The 1968 Air Force Falcons football team represented the United States Air Force Academy as an independent during the 1968 NCAA University Division football season. Led by 11th-year head coach Ben Martin, the Falcons compiled a record of 7–3 and outscored their opponents 251–156. Air Force played their home games at Falcon Stadium in Colorado Springs, Colorado.

Schedule

Roster

References

Air Force
Air Force Falcons football seasons
Air Force Falcons football